Haskell Glacier is a small glacier descending from the Christoffersen Heights and draining west between Prism Ridge and the Forbidden Rocks, in the Jones Mountains of Antarctica.

See also
 List of glaciers in the Antarctic
 Glaciology

References

 

Glaciers of Ellsworth Land